Dry Valley is a census-designated place in Lincoln County, Nevada, United States. As of the 2020 census it had a population of 49.

Geography
The CDP is located in Dry Valley, a flat basin through which Meadow Valley Wash flows before it exits to the southwest into Condor Canyon.

Demographics
As of the 2020 census, Dry Valley had a population of 49 residents, of whom 41 were white, one was Native American or Alaska Native, two were of another race, and five were of two or more races.

References

Census-designated places in Nevada
Census-designated places in Lincoln County, Nevada